Regla Rainierys Gracia Gonzalez (born 28 May 1993) is a Cuban female volleyball player. She is a member of the Cuba women's national volleyball team and played for Camagüey in 2014.

Career
She was part of the Cuban national team at the 2014 FIVB Volleyball Women's World Championship in Italy, and at the 2015 FIVB World Grand Prix.

She won the Best Server award in the 2014 U23 Pan-American Cup.

Clubs
  Camagüey (2014)

Awards

Individuals
 2014 U23 Pan-American Cup "Best Server"

References

1993 births
Living people
Cuban women's volleyball players
Place of birth missing (living people)
Volleyball players at the 2015 Pan American Games
Pan American Games competitors for Cuba
Wing spikers
20th-century Cuban women
21st-century Cuban women